The First National Bank of Greenville is a historic building in Greenville, Mississippi.

Location
The building is located at 302 Main Street in Greenville, Washington County, Mississippi.

History
It was built in 1903 as the headquarters of the first bank chartered by the United States federal government in Washington County, Mississippi. It was designed in the Neoclassical architectural style by Knoxville, Tennessee architects Barber & Kluttz. It was established by James E. Negus, Jr., a Civil War veteran who had served in the Union Army and moved to Mississippi in 1870.

It is now used as a public building for the Greenville Municipal Court.

Heritage significance
It has been listed on the National Register of Historic Places since January 30, 1978.

It was listed again on the National Register in 1997 as a contributing building in the Greenville Commercial Historic District.

References

Bank buildings on the National Register of Historic Places in Mississippi
Neoclassical architecture in Mississippi
Office buildings completed in 1903
National Register of Historic Places in Washington County, Mississippi